Memories Off 3.5 is a double OVA series based on the third and fourth games of the Memories Off series: Omoide ni Kanata Kimi: Memories Off and Memories Off: Sorekara. The first two episodes centre on the events of Omoide ni Kanata Kimi: Memories Off, while the second two episodes centre on Memories Off: Sorekara.

Memories Off 3.5: Omoide no Kanata e
The story takes time shortly after Omoide ni Kanata Kimi: Memories Off ended, where Cubic Cafe's manager dies in an accident while on a date with Kanata.

Memories Off 3.5: Inori no Todoku Toki
The OVA takes time shortly before the Story of Memories Off: Sorekara, where Inori has flashbacks on how she met Isshu.

Characters

Omoide no Kanata e
Shougo

Maguro

Tanaka

Inori no Todoku Toki

Episodes

Music
The OVA used two theme songs: the opening is "Dry Words, Dry Maker" by Masumi Asano and the ending is "Shining Star" by Ayumi Murata.

References

External links
 

2004 anime OVAs
Memories Off